Manuel dos Anjos (born 18 March 1913 - deceased) also known as Pocas was a Portuguese footballer who played as midfielder in service of FC Porto.

Honours
Porto
Primeira Liga (2): 1938–39, 1939–40
Campeonato de Portugal (1): 1936–37

External links 
 
 
 

1913 births
People from Chaves, Portugal
Portuguese footballers
Association football midfielders
Primeira Liga players
FC Porto players
Portugal international footballers
Year of death missing
Sportspeople from Vila Real District